Peter J. Smith (born 26 January 1960) is a former Australian rules footballer who played with North Melbourne and the Brisbane Bears in the Victorian Football League (VFL) during the 1980s.

Smith played 11 games in the 1983 VFL season, which was the most times he would appear in a season for North Melbourne. The tally included North Melbourne's finals campaign, with Smith playing a semi final and preliminary final.

He was still a fringe player when he left the club at the end of the 1986 season to join the league's newest club, Brisbane, with whom he would make four appearances.

References

Australian rules footballers from Victoria (Australia)
North Melbourne Football Club players
Brisbane Bears players
Jacana Football Club players
Living people

1960 births